The 1894–95 Football Tournament was the 6th staging of The Football Tournament.

Overview
It was contested by 3 teams, which was the lowest number of participants in the history of the competition thus far, but on the other hand, they managed to complete all the matches for the first time in the history of the competition. Akademisk Boldklub won the championship for the fourth time in a row.

League standings

References

External links
RSSSF

1894–95 in Danish football
Top level Danish football league seasons
The Football Tournament seasons
Denmark